Zlatomir Obradov (25 January 1941 – 24 April 2013) was a Croatian footballer during the 1960s and later coach. He was a midfield player and, if necessary, played in the forwards.

Playing career
In his native village of Bašaid near Kikinda, he played for the local team, then in Kikinda for the Odred and after three years he moved on loan to FK Proleter Zrenjanin, where he was the best player and scorer. In 1966 he was moved to the Hajduk Split and played there for three years. Overall, for Hajduk he played 86 matches and scored 46 goals.

Coaching career
After a playing career as a one time involved with the coaching. In 1975, he was the coach of RNK Split, and later coached the NK Jadran Ploče.

He died in Ploče.

Honours and awards
Hajduk Split
Yugoslav Cup: 
Winner: 1966–67

References

External links
 
Preminuo Zlatomir Obradov at Hajduk Split's official website

1941 births
2013 deaths
People from Kikinda
Association football midfielders
Yugoslav footballers
FK Proleter Zrenjanin players
HNK Hajduk Split players
Yugoslav First League players
Yugoslav football managers
RNK Split managers